Yuat Rural LLG is a local-level government (LLG) of East Sepik Province, Papua New Guinea. It is named after the Yuat River. The Yuat languages are spoken in this LLG.

Wards
01. Kundima
02. Aragunum
03. Saparu
04. Kinakaten
05. Akuran
06. Branda
07. Biwat (Mundugumor language and Bun language speakers)
08. Muruat
09. Dimiri
10. Bun (Bun language speakers?)
11. Sipisipi
12. Girin (Kyenele language speakers)
13. Asangumut
14. Mensuat
15. Yambimbit
16. Kambambit
17. Nadvari
18. Andafugun
19. Yambaidog
20. Olimolo
21. Itipino

See also
Yuat languages
Upper Yuat languages

References

Local-level governments of East Sepik Province